Binding may refer to:

Computing
 Binding, associating a network socket with a local port number and IP address
 Data binding, the technique of connecting two data elements together
 UI data binding, linking a user interface element to an element of a domain model, such as a database field
 XML data binding, representing XML document data using objects and classes
 Key binding, or keyboard shortcut, mapping key combinations to software functionality
 Language binding, a library providing a functional interface to second library in a different programming language
 Name binding, the association of code or data with an identifier in a programming language
 Late binding, name binding which is resolved at run-time rather than in pre-execution time

Science
 Binding problem, a term for several problems in cognitive science and philosophy
 Neural binding, synchronous activity of neurons and neuronal ensembles
 Molecular binding, an attractive interaction between two molecules
 Binding (linguistics), the distribution of pronouns etc. to identify syntactic relationships

People
 Carly Binding (born 1978), New Zealand pop singer-songwriter
 Karl Binding (1841–1920), German jurist
 Lee Binding (born 1975), graphic designer
 Lothar Binding (born 1950), German politician
 Rudolf G. Binding (1867–1938), German writer and supporter of Adolf Hitler

Textiles
 Binding (knitting), a type of gather also known as a pullover stitch
 Binding (sewing), a finish to a seam or hem
 Binding knot,  a knot used to keep objects together
 Binding off, in knitting, a family of techniques for ending a column of stitches

Other uses
 Binding and loosing, in the New Testament, both forbidding and permitting an action
 Binding Brauerei, a brewery in Frankfurt, Germany
 Binding precedent, a legal decision that must be applied or followed
 Binding (woodworking), an inlaid edging, often used to reduce fluctuations in the wood's humidity
 Bookbinding, the protective cover of a book and the art of its construction
 Coil binding or spiral binding, is a commonly used book binding style for documents
 Comb binding, cerlox or surelox binding, a method of binding pages into a book
 Breast binding or chest binding, a wrapping to form a bra-like structure
 Foot binding, a Chinese custom practiced on young girls from the 10th to early 20th centuries
 Legally binding, enforceable by law
 Ski binding, an attachment which anchors a ski boot to the ski
 Snowboard binding, a device for connecting a foot to a snowboard

See also
 Binding protein, a protein whose principal function is to associate with or carry another molecule
 Binding neuron, a 1998 abstract mathematical model of the electrical activity of a neuron
 Binding domain, a protein domain in a binding protein
 Binding constant, an equilibrium constant associated with the reaction of receptor and ligand molecules
 Binding energy, the energy required to dissociate a molecule or complex into its component parts
 Binding agent, a substance that holds or draws other materials together to form a cohesive whole
 Competitive binding, inhibition of substrate binding to an enzyme
 Bind (disambiguation)
 Binder (disambiguation)
 Bound (disambiguation)